Anatoma pseudoequatoria is a species of minute sea snail, a marine gastropod mollusk or micromollusk in the family Anatomidae.

Distribution
This species occurs in the Pacific Ocean off Hawaii.

References

 Bandel (1998). Mitt. Geol.-Pal. Inst. Univ. Hamburg 81 : 1-119
 Geiger D.L. & Jansen P. 2004. Revision of the Australian species of Anatomidae (Mollusca: Gastropoda: Vetigastropoda). Zootaxa 415 : 1-35
 Geiger D.L. (2012) Monograph of the little slit shells. Volume 1. Introduction, Scissurellidae. pp. 1-728. Volume 2. Anatomidae, Larocheidae, Depressizonidae, Sutilizonidae, Temnocinclidae. pp. 729–1291. Santa Barbara Museum of Natural History Monographs Number 7

External links
 To World Register of Marine Species

Anatomidae
Gastropods described in 1979